The year 2017 was the 46th year after the independence of Bangladesh. It was also the fourth year of the third term of the Government of Sheikh Hasina.

Incumbents

 President: Abdul Hamid
 Prime Minister: Sheikh Hasina
 Chief Justice: Surendra Kumar Sinha

Demography

Economy

Note: For the year 2017 average official exchange rate for BDT was 80.44 per US$.

Events

23 March – Bangladesh Police surrounded a suspected militant hideout in South Surma Upazila, Sylhet, Bangladesh. The police unit was reinforced with personnel from a rapid reaction battalion on the Friday.
25 March – Operation Twilight was launched by the 1st Para Commando Battalion of the Bangladesh Army under the command of Major General Anwarul Momen,  GOC 17th Infantry Division in Jalalabad Cantonment. First the security forces established a three kilometre perimeter around the militant hideout. Then the operation was launched on Saturday morning at 8am. Two militants were killed in the initial attack, one of whom detonated a suicide vest. The commandos rescued 78 civilians who had been trapped in the building since Thursday.
26 March – While Operation Twilight was in progress, militants bombed a crowd of about 500–600 onlookers gathered near the cordon perimeter, which was about 400 metres from the militant hideout.
9 April – Prime Minister Sheikh Hasina made a landmark visit to neighboring India and signed 22 new deals and MoUs with India taking the Indo-BD bilateral relationships to a new height. This also included a defense cooperation, originally proposed by India.
30 May – More than 300,000 people are evacuated in Bangladesh as Cyclone Mora approaches.
13 June – At least 152 people are dead and dozens are missing in landslides caused by days of heavy monsoonal rain in Bangladesh.
18 August – Flooding in South Asia has displaced tens of thousands of people and resulted in an estimated 500 deaths across India, Bangladesh, and Nepal. 
27 August – Dozens of Rohingya Muslims fleeing renewed violence in Rakhine State are detained by Bangladeshi and Burmese authorities after they attempt to cross the border from Myanmar to Bangladesh. Many were en route to Kutupalong Refugee Camp, a refugee camp in Ukhia, Bangladesh, mostly inhabited by Rohingya refugees.
31 August – Twenty-six bodies of women and children are recovered after three boats carrying ethnic Rohingya fleeing violence in Myanmar sink in the Naf River in Bangladesh's Cox's Bazar District.
5 September – More than 123,000 Rohingya refugees have fled Myanmar and crossed into Bangladesh due to escalating violence by the Myanmar Army.
6 September – Bangladesh accuses the Myanmar Army of laying landmines on the border between both countries to prevent the return of fleeing Rohingya refugees. Myanmar denies the Bangladeshi claims.
12 September – Bangladeshi Prime Minister Sheikh Hasina accuses the Burmese government of "atrocities" against the Rohingya people and calls for these alleged atrocities to stop.
16 September – Bangladesh announces plans to build a giant refugee camp the size of a small city to house nearly 700,000 Rohingya refugees. 
28 September – At least 14 Rohingya people, including 10 children, fleeing violence in Myanmar are killed when their boat apparently hits a submerged object and capsizes just yards from the Bangladesh coast.
8 October – A refugee boat en route to Bangladesh from Myanmar capsizes, resulting in at least 12 deaths.
19 November – Chinese delegates visiting the Burmese capital of Naypyidaw propose a three-phase plan to resolve the conflict in Myanmar's Rakhine State. The governments of Myanmar and Bangladesh expressed support for the plan, which included repatriating refugees that have fled from violence in Rakhine State.
23 November – Bangladesh's Foreign Minister A. H. Mahmood Ali and Myanmar's State Counsellor Aung San Suu Kyi agree to return Rohingya refugees from Bangladesh to Myanmar in a two-month period. (The Australian)
2 December – Pope Francis ends his six-day trip to Myanmar and Bangladesh by visiting the Rohingya refugees in Dhaka.

Awards and Recognitions

Independence Day Award
The award was given to fifteen people and an organization.

Ekushey Padak

The award was given to 17 persons.
 Sharifa Khatun, language movement
 Shushama Das, music
 Julhas Uddin Ahmed, music
 Ustad Azizul Islam, music
 Tanvir Mokammel, film
 Syed Abdullah Khalid, sculpture
 Sara Zaker, acting
 Abul Momen, journalism
 Syed Akram Hossain, research
 Alamgir Muhammad Serajuddin, education
 Jamilur Reza Choudhury, science and technology
 Mahmud Hassan, social welfare
 Omar Ali, language and literature
 Sukumar Barua, language and literature
 Swadesh Roy, journalism
 Shamim Ara Nipa, choreography
 Rahmatullah Al Mahmud Selim, music.

Sports
 Football:
 The "Under-18" team became runner up in the SAFF U-18 Championship held in Bhutan and the "Under-15" team secured the third position in the SAFF U-15 Championship held in Nepal.
 Dhaka Abahani won Premier League title.
 Cricket:
The Bangladesh cricket team toured India in February to play one Test match. India won the Test match by 208 runs.
Later Bangladesh toured Sri Lanka in March and April. The tour consisted of a series of two Test matches, three One Day Internationals (ODIs) and two Twenty20 internationals (T20Is). The Test series was drawn 1–1, with Bangladesh winning the second match by 4 wickets. It was their first win against Sri Lanka in a Test match. The victory was their ninth win in Tests and their fourth overseas. The ODI series was drawn 1–1, with the second of the third match ending in a no result, due to rain. The T20I series also finished 1–1.
Bangladesh competed in the Ireland Tri-Nation Series in May against Ireland and New Zealand. They won 2 of their 4 ODIs in the tournament.
The Australia cricket team toured Bangladesh in August and September to play two Test matches. Bangladesh won the first Test by 20 runs, their first ever victory against Australia in a Test match. Australia won the second Test by 7 wickets, therefore drawing the series 1–1.
Then the Bangladesh team toured South Africa in September and October to play two Tests, three One Day Internationals (ODIs) and two Twenty20 International (T20I) matches. It was Bangladesh's first tour of South Africa in nine years. South Africa won the Test series 2–0, the ODI series 3–0 and the T20I series 2–0.

Deaths

17 January – M. M. Ruhul Amin, former Chief Justice (b. 1942).
23 January – Mirza Ali Behrouze Ispahani, businessman (b. 1950)
5 February – Suranjit Sengupta, politician (b. 1945).
19 March – Zubaida Gulshan Ara, writer (b. 1943/44)
27 March – Mizu Ahmed, actor (b. 1953)
28 March – Ibne Mizan, film director (b. 1930)
21 April – Lucky Akhand, singer (b. 1956)
6 May – Mihir Kumar Nandi, singer (b. 1945)
17 May – Faruq Ahmed Choudhury, diplomat (b. 1934)
6 June – Latifur Rahman, former Chief Justice and Chief Advisor (b. 1936)
27 June – Sudhin Das, musician (b. 1930)
28 June – Nazmul Huda Bachchu, actor (b. 1938)
1 August – Harunur Rashid Khan Monno, industrialist and politician (b. 1932)
21 August –  Abdur Razzak, actor (b. 1942)
30 August –  Abdul Jabbar, singer (b. 1938)
15 September – Dwijen Sharma, writer (b. 1929)
19 October – Father Marino Rigon, missionary priest (b. 1925)
24 October – M. K. Anwar, politician (b. 1933)
3 November – Abdur Rahman Biswas, politician and former president (b. 1926)
24 November – Bari Siddiqui, singer-song writer and folk musician (b. 1954)
19 November – Akhtar Hameed Siddiqui, politician and former deputy-speaker of Jatiya Sangsad (b. 1947)
26 November – Rahija Khanam Jhunu, dancer (b. 1943)
29 November –  Aminul Islam, academic (b. 1935)
30 November - Annisul Huq, entrepreneur, TV presenter and sitting Mayor of Dhaka North City Corporation (b. 1952)
15 December – A. B. M. Mohiuddin Chowdhury, politician and former city mayor of Chittagong (b. 1944)

See also
 2010s in Bangladesh
 List of Bangladeshi films of 2017
 Timeline of Bangladeshi history

References

 
2010s in Bangladesh
Years of the 21st century in Bangladesh
Bangladesh
Bangladesh